The 2013 FIVB Volleyball World League qualification was a qualification tournament to determine the final two spots for the 2013 World League. It was held from 24 August to 9 September 2012.

Teams

Pool standing procedure
 Match points
 Number of matches won
 Sets ratio
 Points ratio
 Result of the last match between the tied teams

Match won 3–0 or 3–1: 3 match points for the winner, 0 match points for the loser
Match won 3–2: 2 match points for the winner, 1 match point for the loser

First round
All times are local.

Playoff 1

|}

|}

Playoff 2

|}

|}

Second round
All times are local.

Playoff 1

|}

|}

Playoff 2

|}

|}

References

External links
Official website

FIVB Volleyball World League
Qualification for volleyball competitions
2012 in volleyball